The  was a limited-stop "Rapid" train service in Japan operated by the East Japan Railway Company (JR East) between  and  on the Shinetsu Main Line from October 1997 until March 2015. The train was named after Mount Myōkō on the boundary between Nagano and Niigata Prefecture.

Service pattern
Services consisted of five trains in each direction daily.

Rolling stock
Services were formed using a fleet of three Nagano-based 6-car 189 series EMUs, numbered N101 to N103, of which the rear car (car 1 from Nagano, car 6 from Naoetsu) was designated as reserved seating.

Formation
Trains were formed as shown below, with car 1 at the Nagano end.

Set N101 had 183-1500 series driving cars.

History

Original semi express

From the start of the timetable revision in October 1961, the former Shirakaba daytime service between Ueno and Nagano was extended to run to Naoetsu, and became the Myōkō 1 service.

Diesel express
From 1 December 1962, new KiHa 57 series 6-car diesel multiple unit (DMU) trains were introduced on the daytime Myōkō service, which was upgraded to "express" status. The overnight semi express service was meanwhile renamed Asama.

Electrification
Following the electrification of the Shinetsu Main Line between Takasaki and Naoetsu, new 165 series 8-car electric multiple unit (EMU) trains were introduced on Myōkō services from the start of the October 1966 timetable revision.

With the expansion of daytime Hakusan and Asama services, daytime Myōkō services were cut back, and from the start of the November 1982 timetable revision, consisted of one overnight return working formed of 14 series locomotive-hauled sleeping car and seating accommodation coaches. From March 1985, the locomotive-hauled rolling stock was replaced with 169 series EMUs, and from March 1988, these sets were themselves replaced by 9-car 189 series EMUs also used on Asama services, with the operating route reduced to between Ueno and Nagano. These services were ultimately discontinued from 18 March 1993.

Rapid service (October 1997 - March 2015)
The Myōkō name was revived for new rapid services introduced from the start of the revised timetable on 1 October 1997, named Shinetsu Relay Myōkō, to provide connections at Nagano with the newly opened Nagano Shinkansen services. This was renamed Myōkō from 1 December 2002 following the discontinuation of the Minori limited express services which operated between Nagano and Niigata.

From the start of the revised timetable on 17 March 2012, two Myōkō services in each direction (services 3, 6, 7, 10) were discontinued, with the remaining three return workings operated using regular commuter rolling stock.

The remaining Myōkō services were finally discontinued from the start of the revised timetable on 14 March 2015, coinciding with the opening of the Hokuriku Shinkansen extension from Nagano to Kanazawa. The last train ran on 13 March 2015.

See also
 List of named passenger trains of Japan

References

External links

Named passenger trains of Japan
East Japan Railway Company
Railway services introduced in 1958
Railway services discontinued in 2015
1958 establishments in Japan
2015 disestablishments in Japan
Rail transport in Nagano Prefecture
Rail transport in Niigata Prefecture

ja:くびき野 (列車)#妙高